Avalo is an unincorporated community in Weld County, in the U.S. state of Colorado.

History
A post office called Avalo was established in 1898, and remained in operation until 1936. Avalo is a name derived from Spanish meaning "earthquake".

References

Unincorporated communities in Weld County, Colorado
Unincorporated communities in Colorado